Downtown Lullaby is an album of improvised music by John Zorn, Elliott Sharp, Bobby Previte and Wayne Horvitz. The album was released on the Depth of Field label in 1998 and contains seven tracks titled after addresses of performing spaces in the East Village and Soho.

Reception
The Allmusic review by Brian Olewnick awarded the album 2½ stars stating "Downtown Lullaby isn't a bad record but, given the personnel, one would have hoped for more".

Track listing
All compositions by Horovitz/Previte/Sharp/Zorn
 "484 Broome" - 5:42
 "500 West 52nd" - 6:15
 "Eighth Between B & C" - 6:11
 "77 White" - 3:57
 "228 West Broadway" - 9:07
 "Bleecker & Bowery" - 7:16
 "1 Morton St (Downtown Lullaby)" - 9:00

Personnel
Elliott Sharp – electric guitars
Wayne Horvitz – keyboards, Hammond organ, piano
Bobby Previte – drums
John Zorn – alto

References

John Zorn albums
Wayne Horvitz albums
1998 albums